Plant Based News is a UK-based website about veganism and plant-based living, founded by Klaus Mitchell and Robbie Lockie.

References

External links

Veganism in the United Kingdom
Vegetarian publications and websites
British news websites